M3 Technology was founded as J&K Electronics Inc. in 1998 as a distributor of electronic components on Long Island. In 2004, the company was renamed M3 Technology, and established a new focus; the supply of parts and components to the aerospace industry.

M3 Technology has now become The Aerospace & Defense Solutions company, but maintains its presence in the Electronics Industry.

Among the projects the company works on is the supply of parts and components to the MRAP program, logistical support of the New Iraqi Air force, and global supply services for the armed forces of Taiwan and Japan.  In addition, M3 Technology is intimately involved with the defense industry of Turkey, and is a supplier of parts and supplies for many defense contractors in the country.

M3 Technology provides support services for platforms including:

Bradley Fighting Vehicle
Bell Huey
Mil Mi-17
F-35 Lightning II
M1 Abrams
B-52 Stratofortress
Orion spacecraft
M3 Technology is certified to the AS 9120 International Standard for Quality Management.  This Standard is derived from the ISO9001 family of certifications, and registration is maintained through Underwriters Laboratories.  In June 2011, the company received certification to the ANSI-ESD S20.20 Standard from QMI-SAI Global.

The company is registered as both an Exporter and a broker of United States Munitions List items through the United States Department of State and The Department of Defense Trade Controls.

Leadership
Janine Massa - President
Ken Massa - CEO & Executive Vice President
Mike Caton - COO & Vice President of Operations
Paul Palumbo - CFO
Audrey Blessinger - Purchasing Manager
Christina Lipp - Logistics Manager
Melissa Phillips - Supply Chain Manager

M3 Race Team 

In addition to its activity as the Aerospace & Defense Solutions Company, M3 Technology owns and operates a race team.  Led by driver Justin Bonsignore, the team competes in the NASCAR Whelen Modified Tour.

In 2010, Justin Bonsignore was named the 2010 Sunoco Rookie of the Year.

In 2018, Justin Bonsignore won the 2018 NASCAR Whelen Modified Tour championship on the strength of 8 wins, 5 poles, 12 Top 5's, 15 top 10's, and 695 laps lead, leading every category in dominating fashion.

References 

Aerospace companies of the United States
Electronics companies of the United States